Hendrik Rasmussen (4 April 1887 – 5 August 1969) was a Danish gymnast. He competed in the men's team event at the 1908 Summer Olympics.

References

1887 births
1969 deaths
Danish male artistic gymnasts
Olympic gymnasts of Denmark
Gymnasts at the 1908 Summer Olympics
Sportspeople from Copenhagen